The first season of the American superhero television series The Boys, the first series in the franchise based on the comic book series of the same name written by Garth Ennis and Darick Robertson, was developed for television by American writer and television producer Eric Kripke. The season was produced by Sony Pictures Television in association with Point Grey Pictures, Original Film, Kripke Enterprises, Kickstart Entertainment and KFL Nightsky Productions.

The first season of the series stars Karl Urban, Jack Quaid, Antony Starr, Erin Moriarty, Dominique McElligott, Jessie T. Usher, Laz Alonso, Chace Crawford, Tomer Kapon, Karen Fukuhara, Nathan Mitchell, and Elisabeth Shue. The story takes place in a universe where most of the superpowered individuals are recognized as superheroes, but in reality abuse their powers for personal gain, information the public is kept unaware of. The series follows the eponymous Boys (led by Billy Butcher), a group of vigilantes looking to bring down Vought International and expose its corrupt superheroes. When his girlfriend is accidentally killed by A-Train, Hughie Campbell joins the Boys to get revenge against the Seven. Meanwhile, Annie January is forced to face the truth about those she admires, after she joins the Seven, led by Homelander. The Boys attempt to stop Vought from receiving government support for superheroes by uncovering the company's secrets. When Hughie and Annie begin a romantic relationship, the conflict is muddled despite the two of them initially being unaware of each other's affiliations.

All eight episodes of the season were released on the streaming service Amazon Prime Video on July 26, 2019, attracting a high viewership, making the show one of the most successful originals ever released by Prime Video at the moment. It received largely positive reviews from critics and audiences, with high praise for its social commentary, story, black humor, faithfulness to the comics, screenplay and the performances of Urban and Starr. On July 19, 2019, the series was renewed for a second season.

Episodes

Cast and characters

Main

 Karl Urban as William "Billy" Butcher 
 Jack Quaid as Hugh "Hughie" Campbell Jr.
 Antony Starr as John / Homelander 
 Erin Moriarty as Annie January / Starlight
 Dominique McElligott as Maggie Shaw / Queen Maeve 
 Jessie T. Usher as Reggie Franklin / A-Train 
 Laz Alonso as Marvin T. "Mother's" Milk / MM 
 Chace Crawford as Kevin Moskowitz / the Deep 
 Tomer Capon as Serge / Frenchie 
 Karen Fukuhara as Kimiko Miyashiro / the Female
 Nathan Mitchell as Earving / Black Noir 
 Elisabeth Shue as Madelyn Stillwell

Recurring
 Simon Pegg as Hugh Campbell Sr.
 Alex Hassell as Translucent
 Colby Minifie as Ashley Barrett
 Shaun Benson as Ezekiel
 Ann Cusack as Donna January
 Jess Salgueiro as Robin Ward
 Jennifer Esposito as Susan Raynor
 Jordana Lajoie as Cherie Sinclair 
 Mishka Thébaud as Shockwave
 Malcolm Barrett as Seth Reed
 Christian Keyes as Nathan Franklin
 Brittany Allen as Charlotte / Popclaw 
 Shantel VanSanten as Becca Butcher

Guest
 Giancarlo Esposito as Stan Edgar 
 Nicola Correia-Damude as Elena
 Laila Robins as Grace Mallory
 Haley Joel Osment as Charles / Mesmer 
 Dan Darin-Zanco as Doppelganger
 David Reale as Evan Lambert
 Débora Demestre as Isadora 
 Brit Morgan as Rachel Saunders 
 Jackie Tohn as Courtenay
 John Doman as Jonah Vogelbaum
 Alvina August as Monique
 Brendan Beiser as Jeff 
 Nalini Ingrita as Janine
 Krishan Dutt as Naqib
 Jim Beaver as Robert "Bob" Singer

Billy Zane, Jimmy Fallon, Mike Massaro, Seth Rogen, and Tara Reid made cameo appearances as themselves, with Zane appearing in a Popclaw fictional film within the series and at a comic convention in the episodes "Goof for the Soul" and "The Innocents" respectively, Fallon interviewing Translucent during his talk show in the episode "The Name of the Game", and Massaro portraying an ESPN interviewer for the episodes "Cherry" and "Get Some", while Rogen and Reid appeared as themselves in interviews for the episode "The Innocents".

Production

Development
Between 2008 and 2016, it was originally planned to make a film adaptation of The Boys having been in various stages of development. Columbia Pictures was initially the studio in charge to bring the adaptation with a budget of $100 million and Adam McKay as the director. However the project was abandoned due to a series of creatives differences between the studio and McKay. However the production of the film was revived by Paramount Pictures, having managed to get the rights of the project in August 2012, but then on April 6, 2016, it was announced that Cinemax would be developing a television series adaptation of the comic book instead, cancelling the original plans for a film adaptation. Eric Kripke, Evan Goldberg, and Seth Rogen were approached and then recruited during the production of the series Preacher, with Kripke serving as the showrunner of the series and Goldberg and Rogen as directors. Kripke, Rogen and Robertson were also selected as executive producer. Garth Ennis and Darick Robertson were selected to serve as co-executive producers. The confirmed production companies to be involved with the series were Point Grey Pictures, Original Film, and Sony Pictures Television. 

However, on November 8, 2017, Amazon Prime Video managed to get the rights of The Boys and started the production of the first season consisting of eight episodes, with the production expected to begin at the spring of 2018 for a planned release at 2019. At the time, Amazon was failing to get hits with its originals which led them to make several deals with auspices from other successful series hoping to make the next big genre drama hit show like Game of Thrones, The Walking Dead and Stranger Things. The series was confirmed to be at development for several months preceding the series order announcement and it was also confirmed that the creative team that were hired for the previous adaptations were still attached to the series. On April 30, 2018, Dan Trachtenberg replaced Seth Rogen and Evan Goldberg as the directors of the show. Kripke, Goldberg, Rogen, Neal H. Moritz, Pavun Shetty, Ori Marmur, James Weaver, Ken Levin, and Jason Netter were confirmed to serve as the executive producers for the series. Garth Ennis and Darick Robertson were recruited to serve as the co-executive producers.

Writing
The Boys takes place in a universe where the superheroes are interpreted as corrupt celebrities who abuse their powers. Kripke wanted to explore how these heroes would be portrayed in real life, leading to several discussions of how to deconstruct the old myth of superheroes. He has admitted to being a fan of Marvel, but believes that the old superhero myth portrayed in the comics and films would not happen in the real world as he considers that the people are selfish, believing that a person won't do something noble once it suddenly gains superpowers. As a long time fan of the comic-book series The Boys, Kripke began to follow every other work written by Garth Ennis during his college years. However he didn't intend to write the series exactly as the comics, feeling that it would disastrous, leading him to make some changes to the series. The writers agreed that they needed to adjust the characters to fit the story, so long as they were complex and recognizable. In order to balance the show's satire and superhero tropes, Kripke explained: "We let any comedy or absurdity emerge out of the natural contradictions of putting a fantasy element in the real world. And so when those people have to take shits and go get tacos, it just gets funny." 

The season does not fully follow the storyline from the comics despite its faithfulness to the comic book series, as Kripke maintained the writers disciplined with the intention of retaining the show with a sense of reality by saying: "Anything that comes out of this drug is viable, and anything that doesn't we're not allowed to do". The show most difficult part was the moment when Starlight is sexually assaulted, due to the MeToo movement, leading to several debates and discussions of how to adapt it. It was originally intended that Starlight would payback during the behind-the-scenes ways inside the corporation, but it was eventually changed to make her go public instead. Another change of the sexual assault storyline is that the Deep assaults Starlight, instead of Homelander, A-Train, and Black Noir like the comics. Butcher's wife Becky storyline is also changed, as Kripke didn't wanted to use the convention of killing off female characters to motivate the heroes and wanted to surprise the readers by keeping her alive instead of killing her after giving birth. Another major change for the series is the plane scene, where Homelander and Queen Maeve attempts to save the citizens from the plane goes wrong and the former decides to let everyone die. In the comics the accident already succeeded before the events of the story in September 11, where the Seven instead of only Homelander and Queen Maeve intercepted a plane going to crash in the Twin Towers, but also goes awry when Homelander accidentally destroys the plane which killed everyone, including a member of the team. This was changed to explore deeper the dynamic between Homelander and Queen Maeve, and the show taking place in a modern day.

The show also includes characters that don't exist in the comics. Jack from Jupiter is replaced in the series with an original and more human character known as Translucent, although he keeps the power of his indestructible skin. Kripke revealed that he made the change, as he felt that the former alien-looking design was too fantastic for the world they were creating in the series and that would mess with the mythology of the human characters being born with powers. Oh Father was also replaced in the series for an original character Ezekiel who is also portrayed as a Christian themed supe but unlike the former, he is not portrayed as a pedophile but instead as a hypocritical homophobic. Another character introduced in the series is Mesmer though unlike the previous two, he is not based in any character introduced in the comics and is fully original for the show.

Casting
On December 18, 2017, it was announced that Erin Moriarty has been cast in the lead role of Annie January/Starlight. On January 17, 2018, it was reported that Antony Starr, Dominique McElligott, Chace Crawford, Jessie Usher, and Nathan Mitchell had joined the main cast as the Seven. In March 2018, Laz Alonso, Jack Quaid, and Karen Fukuhara joined the cast in series regular roles, as the members of the Boys. On April 5, 2018, it was confirmed that Karl Urban had been cast in the series' lead role of Billy Butcher. On May 16, 2018, it was announced that Elisabeth Shue had been cast in the series regular role of Madelyn Stillwell. On June 25, 2018, Tomer Kapon confirmed that he joined the main cast in the role of Frenchie. On August 30, 2018, Jennifer Esposito revealed that she was selected for the recurring role of CIA Agent Susan Raynor.

On October 5, 2018, it was announced during the annual New York Comic Con that Simon Pegg had been cast in the role of Hughie's father. According to the artist Robertson, Hughie was drawn in the comics to resemble Pegg after he saw Pegg in the sitcom Spaced, but Pegg thought he was too old to play the role of Hughie in the TV series. Alex Hassell also made an appearance in the series as a guest actor, appearing as Translucent. Giancarlo Esposito made a guest appearance in the season finale as Vought International CEO, Stan Edgar. Haley Joel Osment also joined the cast in a recurring role, as the retired superhero Mesmer.

During the auditions, Starr and Usher admitted not being optimistic on getting their roles initially. Starr believed that he wasn't the man they were seeking and was convinced that he would never get his role. Starr only filmed a self tape to "spite" his representants, but managed to be cast in the role and decided to finally read the script. Usher believed that his own audition wasn't convincing and when he did it for the second time, he still wasn't convinced but eventually admitted being shocked at having managed to get the role. On the other side Moriarty, Urban and Quaid were more optimistic about being cast at their respective roles. Urban considered the character fun and that would be stupid to turn it down, while Moriarty get through several screen tests for an hour and half that impressed Kripke.

Filming
Despite the series taking place in New York City like in the comics, the show was confirmed to being filmed in Toronto, Canada. Kripke revealed that the show was intended to begin its filming on the spring of 2018 to release the show at the following year. The filming for the first season officially began on May 22, 2018, in Toronto, and was scheduled to last until September 25, 2018. However the production of the show officially ended its filming on October 11, 2018. It was also confirmed that the show would be partially filmed at the cities of Mississauga and Hamilton in a few locations that include the Central Parkway Mall, the Streetsville Gas Station, Tim Hortons Field stadium, and the Fallsview Residence.

For the exterior of the Vought International company headquarters, the crew used Roy Thomson Hall, located in Toronto's entertainment district. The building's structure was digitally altered and extended to become the Seven Tower. For the interior of the Tower, including some of the rooms and the modern lobby where the company celebrates the corporate parties, were filmed inside Roy Thomson Hall. For Times Square, the crew filmed in Yonge–Dundas Square located in Toronto and proceeded to digitally alter it with CGI. A-Train's race with Shockwave was filmed at Hamilton's Tim Hortons Field stadium. The Lower Bay Station was used for the subway scenes, which was also used for some scenes of The Handmaid's Tale. The crew also filmed at the zinc-clad pavilion of the Sherbourne Common waterfront park for the funeral service for the victims of the hijacked plane. For the mansion where Dr. Jonah Vogelbaum lives, the crew filmed at Parkwood Estate in Oshawa, Ontario. For the scene where Annie refuses to help Hughie, the crew filmed at the Cathedral Church of St. James, located in Toronto.

Visual effects 
The Boys featured over 1400 visual effects shots created by  DNEG TV, Framestore, Folks VFX, Mavericks VFX, Method Studios, Monsters Aliens Robots Zombies VFX, Mr. X, Pixomondo, Rocket Science VFX, Rodeo FX, and Soho VFX. Visual effects supervisor Stephan Fleet, revealed that the studio decided to reduce a little amount of blood and gore for the show, with the intention of building a more believable world, following several discussions of how to interpret the comic book series in the show. Fleet explains that the death of Robin was complex to shoot as they needed to find out what a body looks like when it is atomized at 500 fps. The scene took over eight months of work to get the right look and tone for the storyline in the shot, using a Phantom camera and a giant robotic arm better known as a Bolt High-Speed Cinebot to get the right position of the camera. Ultimately it was made of full CGI due to the art direction and the specified time to bring a big amount of practical blood. For Translucent's death scene, a practical bomb was used as they only required to blow up a practical blood bomb inside the room where it was filmed. The first episode used over 300 shots, with some sequences that have five shots that took longer than sequences of 20.

Framestore's executive producer Christopher Gray revealed that the vehicle used for the opening scene of the first episode was indeed secured in the street and then destroyed for real, while Queen Maeve scenes was filmed apart and then added with CGI. Framestore was also in charge of the fight sequence at the final episode having worked for eight weeks in order to get the appropriate research of how light travels in slow motion. Femto-photography was used for the scene to visualize photons and allow the viewers to see the little details from a quick sequence. For the fight between Butcher and Translucent, a double actor for the latter used a gray tracking suit to be erased by Mr. X using it as an animation reference track a digi-double of the Translucent character and simulate blood on him and add effects of him turning on and off. Urban was forced to memorize the fight due to this and had to repeat this several times. DNEG was in charge of the scene where Homelander destroys a plane at the end of the first episode, where Urban was hanged on wires to represent the flight scene that was achieved via a greenscreen shoot. The VFX team was in charge to get refined the right kind of anamorphic lens flare for Homelander's laser eyes with the intention of making them unique to play into the character. Soho VFX was also in charge of the dolphin scene, revealing that a green dolphin was used to then proceed to change it into a CG version of it. Fleet revealed that he enjoyed the experience and said: "They also came up with the idea of him flopping on the ground before the truck hits him. Those little details make it great."

Music
Christopher Lennertz was confirmed to be the composer of the show's soundtrack, having previously worked with the showrunner Kripke for other two shows which are Supernatural and Revolution. Lennertz was hired by Kripke while the former was working for the soundtrack of the adult animated film Sausage Party, where he learned that Rogen and Goldberg where working for a show about corrupt superheroes. Kripke wanted the soundtrack to be "dirt and grime of a messy garage band with the energy of British punk" in order to make a sloppy sound that would make fun of the superhero cliches. Lennertz revealed that the soundtrack combines traditional orchestra and electronics sounds in order to shatter of the comic book heroes. The original soundtrack album for the first season which consists of 50 songs was released digitally through Madison Gate Records on July 26, 2019, alongside the season's release.

Marketing
On September 26, 2018, Amazon released the official poster for the series,  which resembles the cover of The Boys Issue #1. During the New York Comic Con at October 2018, it was released the first teaser trailer for the series. Three months later, on January 24, 2019, Seth Rogen released a teaser trailer through his Twitter account. Steve Seigh from JoBlo have noted that the show offers a look into a "sick, sad world of a superpowered CIA squad whose job it is to closely monitor a superhero community who've let their stature and powers go to their heads over time". He also considered the Seven as a "Justice League-like group of super-powered individuals who after continuously being propped up on society's pedestal, have devolved into villains who lie, drink, and rape their way through the day." On June 17, 2019, individual posters for the members of the Seven begin to be released, with the tagline "Never Meet Your Heroes" which reflects of how the each member of them behave in the series. On April 29, 2019, the show had its premiere at the Tribeca Film Festival presented by AT&T, where the first episode was previewed and Kripke alongside the cast members discussed about the show to the audience.

Release
The first season of The Boys was released on July 26, 2019, on the streaming service Amazon Prime Video. On the day of its release it was confirmed that the show was released just a few hours earlier on July 25, 2019.

Home media 
The first season was released on Blu-ray as part of a six-disc box set of the first two seasons by Sony Pictures Home Entertainment on May 17, 2022. Special features included deleted scenes and a blooper reel.

Reception

Critical response
On Rotten Tomatoes, the first season holds an approval rating of 85% based on 104 reviews, with an average rating of 7.6/10. The website's critical consensus reads, "Though viewers' mileage may vary, The Boys violent delights and willingness to engage in heavy, relevant themes are sure to please those looking for a new group of antiheroes to root for." On Metacritic, the season has a weighted average score of 74 out of 100, based on reviews from 19 critics, indicating "generally favorable reviews".

Christopher Lawrence of the Las Vegas Review-Journal wrote: "Irreverent, deliciously cynical, The Boys follows the greed and corruption behind the superhero industrial complex." Mel Campbell of Screen Hub commented: "Shockingly violent and pointedly political, this Amazon series is an ironic but refreshing antidote to supe franchising. ... The Boys throws our ugly cultural obsessions back in our faces." Daniel Fienberg from Hollywood Reporter in a positive response commented: "I'll have to check in again on The Boys after a few more episodes to get a sense of whether or not the encroaching cynicism topples what I find initially promising here." Graeme Virtue from The Guardian gave the series four of five stars and wrote:"While both have an appealing innocence, it is Moriarty's maltreated but undaunted Starlight who, appropriately, feels like she is preventing the whole thing from collapsing into darkness." Kristy Puchko at IGN gives the first episode a score of 7.2/10 and appreciates how the story comes from the comics but with clever changes. Puchko praises the cast, particularly "Moriarty brings a nuance to her performance that refuses to let Starlight feel like a two-dimensional damsel. She's not naïve. She's hopeful. And she's a fighter. The Boys makes all of that clear in short order." She concludes: "The Boys could still be a thrilling ride as it subverts the expectations of the family-friendly genre, with dark twists and unapologetically graphic scenes of sex and violence. The premiere ep has a lot of heavy lifting to do in exposition, yet Kripke works in some stunner moments, jolts of fun, and stellar action sequences."

Liz Shannon Miller of The A.V. Club wrote: "Karl Urban proves to be a thoroughly committed performer as Billy Butcher, whose dedication to taking down "supes" of course has a personal edge, but then again, when you see what men like the blatantly fake and evil Homelander (Antony Starr) are getting up to it makes sense that he's devoted his life to taking down the cause." Matthew Dessem from Slate commented: "The Boys is an expert deconstruction of superhero stories, with an appropriately wintery view of institutional power, be it corporate, governmental, religious, or caped." Andrew Wyatt from Cinema St. Louis praised the series for its humor and themes by writing:  "Yes, it's cynical and ultra-violent, but what distinguishes 'The Boys' is its sincere fascination with its characters' anxieties, compulsions, and human failings." Meagan Navarro of Bloody Disgusting praised the series for its entertaining story, scoring 4.5 of a 5 and wrote: "Not a frame is spared in crafting this nuanced and darkly humorous universe drenched in blood and violence. All eight episodes are expertly crafted and constructed to tell one cohesive story that will make you gasp, guffaw, and cheer in equal measure." Matthew Gilbert from The Boston Globe wrote: "The premise of the Amazon black comedy is never not fun, and the more we learn about this bizarro world, as the supes go on the late-night talk shows and stage team-up photo ops on various crimes, the better. ... The cast is fine, particularly Shue, who is icily effective; Quaid, whose neurotic but brave fumblings are endearing; and Urban, who is Hughie's gonzo guide. But the real star of “The Boys” is the situation itself."

Ben Travers from IndieWire gave the show a "B". He commented that "Given the top-notch special effects and sharp writing at the core of “The Boys,” there are still loads of potential within this well-realized universe. Let's just hope this ending really did save the cat." Mike Hale from The New York Times praised the series for its departure from the traditional superhero shows including the ones produced by Netflix stating: "The Boys, meanwhile, is offering the kind of smart, easygoing pleasure that most of the Marvel Netflix shows, its closest analogues, didn't quite reach." Daniel D'Addario from Variety recognized the first episode for the potential, though criticized its tone by writing: "All viewers at Tribeca had to go on was a first episode, and “The Boys” could become any number of things as it rolls on. But the tone it struck in its first outing was a dully familiar one — the sense that to transgress, alone, is enough. If this show is to actually satirize the wide-open target of superhero entertainments, it'll need to find a second gear, and quickly." Vinnie Mancuso from Collider appreciated the show social commentary themes and scoring the entire season 5 out of 5 stars: "Like Alan Moore's Watchmen in the late-80s, The Boys TV series has the chance to be the superhero deconstruction of our time. Less a peek behind the curtain, and more a seedy glimpse behind the social media likes and box office numbers, a story that manages to be heartbreakingly relevant while still finding time to have Karl Urban kill a room full of goons with a super-powered baby."

Audience viewership
In October 2019, Nielsen announced it had begun tracking viewership of Amazon Prime programs. It said The Boys had attracted 8million total viewers in its first 10 days of release, making it one of the most successful original programs on Amazon Prime.

Accolades
Wade Barnett, David Barbee, Mason Kopeikin, Brian Dunlop, Ryan Briley, Chris Newlin, Christopher Brooks, Joseph T. Sabella and Jesi Ruppel was nominated for their work on "The Name of the Game" for the Outstanding Sound Editing for a Comedy or Drama Series (One-Hour) award at the 2020 Primetime Creative Arts Emmy Awards.

References

External links

2019 American television seasons
The Boys seasons